Futahashira Shrine (二柱神社, Futahashira jinja) is a Shinto shrine located in Sendai, Miyagi Prefecture, Japan. The main kami enshrined here are Izanagi and Izanami.

See also
List of Shinto shrines in Japan

External links
Official website

Shinto shrines in Miyagi Prefecture